Carbonell may refer to:
Carbonell (surname)
Carbonell Awards annually given to theaters in South Florida
Carbonell Condominium, a residential high-rise building near Miami, Florida, U.S.
Ashford Carbonell, a village in Shropshire, England